The Provisional IRA Honey Trap killings occurred on 23 March 1973. Volunteers from the Provisional IRA's (IRA) Belfast Brigade shot dead three off-duty soldiers from the British Army who had been lured to a house by two females on the Antrim Road in Belfast, Northern Ireland. A fourth soldier survived the shooting.

Background
This was not the first time the IRA used such a so-called "honey trap" tactic to kill British soldiers. In March 1971, three young Scottish soldiers were shot dead at the side of a road after they had been lured out of a Belfast bar by a female Republican who said she would take them to a party. The three soldiers, members of the Royal Highland Fusiliers, were brought in a van to the White Brae, Squire's Hill, off the Ligoniel Road in North Belfast; when they went to urinate at the side of the road they were shot in the back of the head by IRA volunteers. This was only the fourth incident during The Troubles in which British soldiers were killed; the first was the shooting of Robert Curtis just a month earlier on 6 February. However, this was the first time off-duty soldiers were killed in Northern Ireland since the conflict began, as the other three incidents happened during gun battles and rioting.

The killings of the three Scottish soldiers brought more cries from the Unionist community to introduce internment without trial, which was eventually introduced in August 1971 as Operation Demetrius. However, instead of decreasing violence, internment had the opposite effect—violence increased tenfold and support for the IRA grew stronger as the army and government reacted more harshly.

Killings
About a week before the killings, two females met and befriended four British Army sergeants in a Belfast pub. The two women told the soldiers, who were stationed at British Army Headquarters at Thiepval Barracks in Lisburn, that they were having a party on 23 March and the six arranged to meet up.

On 23 March, the four off-duty sergeants, unarmed and in civilian clothes, met the two women at the Woodlands Hotel in Lisburn and later on that night the six drove 12 miles from Lisburn to a flat on the Antrim Road near the New Lodge area in Belfast, where the supposed party was taking place. The flat had food and drink laid out inside to allay any suspicions the soldiers may have had. Shortly after they arrived, one girl said she was going out to bring more women back with her. The one soldier who survived the shooting said that about half an hour after they had arrived two masked gunmen burst into the flat; one had a Thompson submachine gun and the other was carrying a pistol. The soldiers were taken into a bedroom and ordered to lie face down on a bed as the gunmen fired shots into their heads one at a time. Two of the sergeants died instantly, one died a few hours later in hospital and one survived, despite serious injuries to his spine as well as having part of his tongue and jaw shot off.

Aftermath
Later that night, Loyalists shot dead a 28-year-old man outside his house in Durham Street, Belfast, from a passing car.

See also
 Corporals killings
 1988 Lisburn van bombing

References

Deaths by firearm in Northern Ireland
The Troubles in Belfast
Provisional Irish Republican Army actions
1973 in Northern Ireland
Conflicts in 1973
British Army in Operation Banner
Military actions and engagements during the Troubles (Northern Ireland)
20th century in Belfast